Berlin Innsbrucker Platz is a railway station in the Schöneberg district of Berlin and located on the square of the same name. It is also the terminus of the U-Bahn line .

History 
The U-Bahn station opened in 1910 with the original name Hauptstraße, named after the section of the Reichsstraße 1 running through the districts of Schöneberg and Friedenau. When the S-Bahn station was opened in 1933, it was renamed Innsbrucker Platz, after the Tyrolean capital Innsbruck.

After the underground station had been badly damaged in World War II, it was put back into operation on 16 December 1945. The access to the station was completely rebuilt in 1954. The access on the central island on Innsbrucker Platz was closed, instead, a new entrance was created north of the square, on Innsbrucker Straße, in a glazed pavilion typical to the style of the 1950s, which led directly to the platform via a staircase.
 
Between 1971 and 1979, the construction of the Stadtautobahn 100, built through a tunnel under the Innsbrucker Platz, made a further conversion to the U-Bahn station necessary. Between the road surface and the motorway tunnel, a large distribution floor was created, and the southern tunnel of the existing subway was separated. This made an extension of the U4 to the south no longer possible, and also the sidings south of the station could not be used. Since then, the tracks of the U4 end bluntly on the platform.

Notes 

U4 (Berlin U-Bahn) stations
Berlin S-Bahn stations
Buildings and structures in Tempelhof-Schöneberg
Railway stations in Germany opened in 1910